The Battle of Tupelo, also known as the Engagement at Harrisburg, was a battle of the American Civil War fought from July 14 to 15, 1864, near Tupelo, Mississippi. The Union victory over Confederate forces in northeast Mississippi ensured the safety of Sherman's supply lines during the Atlanta Campaign.

Background 

The spring and summer of 1864 found the attention of the people of Mississippi focused on fighting in Virginia and Georgia. Interwoven with, and having important repercussions on, the fighting in northwestern Georgia were military operations in northeast Mississippi designed to prevent the Confederates under Lieutenant-General Stephen D. Lee and Major-General Nathan B. Forrest from striking into middle Tennessee and destroying the single-track railroad over which Sherman's army drew its supplies. The battles of Brice's Crossroads and Tupelo were fought to protect the Union's military railroad.

Prelude 
The Right Wing, 16th Army Corps, commanded by Major-General Andrew J. Smith, advanced into north Mississippi from La Grange, Tennessee, on July 5 without much opposition in two columns until Pontotoc, was closely approached, when his advance was checked by Confederate Brigadier-General James R. Chalmers, Forrest meanwhile making preparations for battle near Okolona. Lee was also with the Confederate forces, and assumed general command.

Three attempts to advance were checked by Forrest's men, on various roads, and on July 12 both columns turned off toward Tupelo. Lee then moved with the divisions of Chalmers and Brigadier-General A. Buford to attack Smith's flank, while Forrest with Mabry's Brigade, the escort, and his old regiment, assailed to the rear. A running fight was kept up for ten miles, but without any considerable advantage to either side except a dash made upon the Federal wagon train by Chalmers, with Rucker's Brigade, near Bartram's Shop. He had possession of the wagon train for a time and killed all the mules, so that the Union forces were compelled to abandon and burn seven wagons, a caisson and two ambulances, but superior numbers soon compelled him to retire.

Opposing forces

Union 
Right Wing, 16th Army Corps: Maj. Gen. Andrew J. Smith
First Division: Brig. Gen. Joseph A. Mower
First Brigade: Col. William L. McMillen
Second Brigade: Col. Alexander Wilkin (k), Col. John D. McClure
Third Brigade: Col. Joseph J. Woods
Fourth Brigade: Col. Lyman M. Ward
Third Division: Col. David Moore
First Brigade: Col. Charles D. Murray
Second Brigade: Col. James I. Gilbert
Third Brigade: Col. Edward H. Wolfe
Cavalry Division: Brig. Gen. Benjamin H. Grierson
Second Brigade: Col. Edward F. Winslow
Third Brigade: Col. Datus E. Coon
First Brigade, U. S. Colored Troops: Col. Edward Bouton

Confederate 
Forrest's Cavalry: Lieut. Gen. Stephen D. Lee, Maj. Gen. Nathan B. Forrest (w)
First Division: Brig. Gen. James R. Chalmers
Roddey's Brigade: Brig. Gen. Philip D. Roddey
McCulloch's Brigade: Col. Robert McCulloch (w)
Rucker's Brigade: Col. Edmund W. Rucker (w), Col. W. L. Duff (w)
Second Division: Brig. Gen. Abraham Buford
Mabry's Brigade: Col. Hinchie P. Mabry
Third (Kentucky) Brigade: Col. Edward Crossland (w)
Fourth (Tennessee) Brigade: Col. Tyree H. Bell
Morgan's Command: Capt. William Campbell

Battle 

On the morning of the 14th, Smith took a strong position at Harrisburg and entrenched. Lee reacted by forming lines with Roddey's Brigade on the right, Mabry's Brigade on the left, and Crossland's Brigade in the middle. Bell's Brigade was put in the front line on Mabry's right. The troops were all dismounted. Both Chalmers' and Buford's divisions were held in reserve. The plan of attack seemed to be swing the right, but Lyon's Brigade became engaged first and was forced to fall back with heavy losses. Chalmers' Division, dismounted, was ordered forward and, after Mabry and Bell had been repulsed, Rucker's Brigade made an equally futile assault. The men were swept away by the fire of a superior and entrenched force, and many fell from exhaustion in the great heat of a July sun. A little after noon the Confederates fell back and entrenched, but were not molested by Union forces, who contented themselves with tearing up the railroad in the vicinity of Tupelo and burning the town of Harrisburg.

On the 15th, it appearing Smith would not attack, Buford made a demonstration on his left flank. Soon afterward Smith began his retreat, and a vigorous pursuit was at once begun. At Old Town Creek Buford came up with the Union in line of battle and was driven back in confusion. McCulloch's Brigade was ordered to attack, but being sent in by regiments was speedily repulsed. Here General Forrest and Colonel McCulloch were both severely wounded, and the command of the forces in front devolved upon Chalmers. Though the pursuit was continued, there was but slight skirmishing after this engagement.

Aftermath 

Sherman, who was closing in on Atlanta, was irritated Smith had not pressed Forrest at Tupelo, believing he should not have been allowed to escape. If Forrest had been allowed to raid into middle Tennessee prior to the capture of Atlanta, it could have had disastrous consequences for the Union. Although Smith failed to destroy Forrest's Cavalry at Tupelo, he did break its combat effectiveness. Forrest would rally his cavalrymen for more daring raids, but never again would they be able to fight and defeat infantry.

Battlefield preservation
The growth of Tupelo and the surrounding area has obscured many of the sites associated with the battle. The battlefield has been partially preserved and is home to the  Tupelo National Battlefield, established on February 21, 1929. The Civil War Trust (a division of the American Battlefield Trust) and its partners have also acquired and preserved  of the Tupelo battlefield.

See also 

 List of American Civil War battles
 Troop engagements of the American Civil War, 1864

References

Sources

Further reading 

 
 
 Parson, Thomas E. Work for Giants: The Campaign and Battle of Tupelo/Harrisburg, Mississippi, June–July 1864. Kent, OH: Kent State University Press, 2014. .

External links 

 Battle of Tupelo at American Battlefield Protection Program
 Battle of Tupelo at Civil War Trust
 Battle of Tupelo at National Park Service

1864 in Mississippi
Atlanta campaign
Battles of Forrest's Defense of Mississippi of the American Civil War
Battles of the Western Theater of the American Civil War
Conflicts in 1864
History of Lee County, Mississippi
July 1864 events
Tupelo National Battlefield
Union victories of the American Civil War